The Church of Jesus Christ of Latter-day Saints (informally known as "Mormons") believe in continuing revelation and an open canon.  Many of the revelations the church's leaders have received have achieved that status of "scripture", and are published in a book called the Doctrine and Covenants. Other revelations have also been received by leaders of the church, but have not been canonized, either because they lack broad applicability, are of dubious origin, or have not been considered yet for inclusion.

Joseph Smith

Brigham Young

Heber C. Kimball

John Taylor

See also 
 List of prophecies of Joseph Smith

References 

The Church of Jesus Christ of Latter-day Saints texts
Latter Day Saint movement lists
Works by presidents of the church (LDS Church)
Works by apostles (LDS Church)
Non-canonical revelations
Revelation in Mormonism